Jerry Max Davis (October 22, 1937 – November 2, 2002) was an American politician. A lawyer, he served as a Republican member for the 45th district of the Georgia House of Representatives.

Life and career 
Davis was born in Carroll County, Georgia. He attended the University of Georgia and Woodrow Wilson College of Law.  Qualified legally, he briefly played American football professionally, and later worked as an insurance claims representative, and later still as a lawyer.

In 1981, Davis was elected to the 45th district of the Georgia House of Representatives, covering part of Atlanta, succeeding George Williamson. Described as a conservative Republican, he served until his death, at which time he was the ranking member of the House Judiciary Committee. Following a reapportionment in the Georgia House, and a lost primary, he was due to end his term in the House at the end of 2002.

Davis died in November 2002 at the age of 65, of a heart attack after attending a campaign meeting for George Bush. His funeral was held at the Church of The Apostles in Atlanta.

Davis was married to Mary, and they had three children, Jerry Max Davis II, Todd Davis and Stacie Davis Rapson.

References 

1937 births
2002 deaths
People from Carroll County, Georgia
University of Georgia alumni
20th-century American politicians
Republican Party members of the Georgia House of Representatives